1987 World Cup may refer to:
 1987 Cricket World Cup
 1987 Rugby World Cup
 1987 World Cup (snooker)